The TGV Duplex is a French high-speed train of the TGV family, manufactured by Alstom, and operated by the French national railway company SNCF. It is unique among TGV trains in that it features bi-level carriages. The Duplex inaugurated the third generation of TGV trainsets. It was specially designed to increase capacity on high-speed lines with saturated traffic. With two seating levels and a seating capacity of 508 passengers, the Duplex increases the passenger capacity. While the TGV Duplex started as a small component of the TGV fleet, it has become one of the system's workhorses.

Purpose

The LGV Sud-Est from Paris to Lyon is the busiest high-speed line in France. After its opening in 1981 it rapidly reached capacity.  Several options were available to increase capacity.  The separation between trains was reduced to three minutes on some TGV lines, but the increasingly complex signalling systems, and high-performance brakes (to reduce braking distance) required, limited this option.  Another option is to widen the train but is generally not practicable due to loading gauge restrictions.  Running two trainsets coupled together in multiple-unit (MU) configuration provides extra capacity, but required very long station platforms.  Given length and width restrictions, the remaining option is to adopt a bi-level configuration, with seating on two levels, adding 45% more passenger capacity.  TGV Duplex sets are often run with a single deck Réseau set or another Duplex set.

History
The Duplex feasibility study was completed in 1987. In 1988, a full-scale mockup was built to gauge customer reactions to the bi-level concept, traditionally associated with commuter and regional rail rather than with high-speed intercity trains. A TGV Sud-Est trailer was tested in revenue service with the inside furnished to simulate the lower floor of a bi-level arrangement, and later that year another TGV Sud-Est was modified to study the dynamic behavior of a train with a higher center of gravity. Discussions with GEC-Alsthom began soon after, and in July 1990 the company won the contract to build the "TGV-2N", as it was then known. The contract was finalized in early 1991, at which point the official order was made. The first tests of a bi-level trainset were in November 1994. The trainset was powered by TGV Réseau power cars at the time, as the Duplex power cars were not ready. The first Duplex power car was mated to the bi-level trailers on 21 June 1995.

Innovations
Perhaps the most important innovation is the efficiency of the Duplex design.  Comparing an original TGV Sud-Est and a Duplex trainset shows that the double-decker design has improvements in both power-to-weight ratio and weight-per-seat overhead:

In this comparison, "power" refers to installed power, not all of which is used when operating.

Aluminium bodies: the strict requirement of a  axle load limit made it imperative to cut down on weight, wherever possible. Extruded aluminum construction made possible a 20% reduction in structure weight.
Improved styling and aerodynamics: the nose of the power units and the gap between trailers were improved such that a Duplex train at cruise speed of  experiences only 4% more drag than a single-level TGV. The nose, the first significant departure from Cooper's original design, was styled by industrial designer Roger Tallon, as was the rest of the trainset.
Crashworthiness: crush zones and rigid passenger compartments protect safety in the event of a collision. The power units' frame is designed to take a (steady-state)  of force frontal load, and features structural fuses to absorb impact energy.
Active pantograph: the Faiveley CX used on the Duplex has a pneumatically actuated active control system. Two small gas cylinders in the wiper armature can tune the stiffness of the pantograph's upper stage, to optimize contact at any speed.
All wheel disc brakes: earlier TGVs (including Eurostar) used disc brakes only on unpowered axles. Weight gains on the Duplex power units allowed the installation of disc brakes directly on the wheels of powered axles (so-called "cheek discs"), instead of using the traditional tread brakes. This does not greatly improve braking performance, but it leaves the wheel tread smooth and considerably reduces rolling noise.
Quiet roof fans: the cooling fans in TGV power units produce the most noticeable sound (a loud hum) when the train is in a station. The fans, located in the roof of the unit, were redesigned to be quieter.
(see TGV world speed record#Record of 2007)

Réseau Duplex

Also known as Réseau Duplex, they take the serial number 600 (601-619). This version came into existence when the carriages of nineteen Réseau sets were used to create the POS sets. The Réseau powercars of these sets, with some aerodynamic adjustments, joined new Duplex sets. They were the first series of "inter-recoupled series" TGV to achieve a sustainable basis by SNCF.

Instead of ordering brand new POS sets, the railways modified a pre-existing order for 19 Duplex as follows:
 19 sets of 8 Duplex-carriages, identical to the original TGV Duplex (Series 200), powered by the 38 surplus TGV Réseau powercars.
 38 new tri-current powercars, based on the Duplex-version, making them suitable for use on the Deutsche Bahn's and Swiss Federal Railways' networks. These were joined to the nineteen sets of Réseau carriages, renovated by Christian Lacroix, becoming the series "4400" or TGV POS.

Their livery is identical to that of other Duplex units. Also called "duplex" (with a lower case "d"), these 19 units, numbered from 601 to 619, are all maintained at the Technicentre South-East Europe depot. This "tinkering" allowed the railways to maintain the pace of delivery of Duplex which was considered a priority.

Dasye
Dasye is a contraction of Duplex Asynchronous ERTMS. The series has a similar design to the classic Duplex series, with internal changes.

These trains are numbered in the "700" class. They feature a new powertrain with asynchronous motors of the same type as that of the motor TGV POS, and they are equipped with ERTMS. Train 701 was delivered in late 2006 and joined with the carriages of Duplex-Réseau unit 619 for pre-production tests. Unit 701 was delivered complete on 14 February 2008.

In June 2007, the SNCF ordered 25 additional Dasye Duplex trainsets. Part of this order is for 55 tri-current trains, a new type high-speed train, and two levels (TGV 2N2) and a reserve engine, permitting a relationship between France and Germany or Switzerland; Alstom call this "Euroduplex".

These trains were planned to strengthen the connections to the south, including the LGV Perpignan–Figueres, allowing joint Franco-Spanish operation. They were completed in February 2010 and used from December 2010 on two round trip Paris - Figueres and in December 2013 for Paris - Barcelona. This new infrastructure was designed for high-speed train traffic, AVE and freight. The 200 and 600 series will not enter the Spanish network, because they are not equipped with ERTMS.

Ninety-five Euroduplex trains were used on the recently opened LGV Rhin-Rhône; made up of the original fifty-five, plus an additional forty ordered by SNCF in April 2012.

The interior trim has new colors (blue) and new interior (with electrical outlets at the seat in the 1st and 2nd class), the remaining facilities are similar to those of duplex and an indicator of the speed of a TGV has been installed in the bar car, above the bar.

Eurotrain

Eurotrain was a consortium formed by Siemens and GEC-Alsthom (today Alstom) in 1996 to market high-speed rail technology in Asia. In 1997, it was one of two competitors to supply the core system of Taiwan High Speed Rail (THSR), and was awarded the status of preferred bidder by concessionaire THSRC.

In early 1998, the consortium created a demonstration train by combining cars of three existing French and German high-speed trains: the intermediate cars of TGV Duplex trainset #224 was joined with German Railways ICE 2 powerheads 402 042 and 402 046 at the two ends.

In December 2000, THSRC awarded the contract to the rival Taiwan Shinkansen Consortium, leading to a legal battle ending in damage payments for Eurotrain in 2004.

See also

 List of high speed trains
 TGV M
 TGV POS
 Thalys
 Eurotrain

References

Double-decker high-speed trains
Duplex
Electric multiple units with locomotive-like power cars
25 kV AC multiple units
15 kV AC multiple units
1500 V DC multiple units of France
Alstom multiple units